Sitana spinaecephalus, the spiny-headed fan-throated lizard, is a species of agamid lizard. It is endemic to India.

References

Sitana
Reptiles of India
Reptiles described in 2016
Taxa named by Veerappan Deepak